Méchin may refer to:

Surname 
 Guillaume Méchin (died 1328), French prelate
 Alexandre Méchin (1772–1849), senior French official and politician
 Jacques Benoist-Méchin (1901–1983), French journalist, historian, musicologist and politician

Places 
 Les Méchins, Quebec, or "Grands-Méchins", a municipality in La Matanie, Bas-Saint-Laurent, Quebec, Canada
 Rivière des Grands Méchins, a river in Les Méchins, La Matanie, Bas-Saint-Laurent, Quebec, Canada
 Rivière des Grands Méchins Ouest, a river in Les Méchins, La Matanie, Bas-Saint-Laurent, Quebec, Canada

See also
 Mechain (disambiguation)